The first season of Everwood, an American drama television series, began airing on September 16, 2002 on The WB television network. The season concluded on May 16, 2003, after 23 episodes.

The season was released on DVD as a six-disc boxed set under the title of Everwood: The Complete First Season on May 4, 2004 by Warner Bros. Home Entertainment.

Plot
The season begins with the arrival of Dr. Andrew "Andy" Brown (Treat Williams), a widower who leaves his successful job as a top Manhattan neurosurgeon to live in a small Colorado town, bringing his 9-year-old daughter Delia (Vivien Cardone) and 15-year-old son Ephram (Gregory Smith) with him. He chooses the town of Everwood because his late wife had told him of her emotional attachment to the town. Many of the story lines revolve around settling into a new town, dealing with the death of the mother and wife of the family, and the growing relationship between Andy and his son, who did not interact much in New York, due to the demands of Andy's job. Andy at first finds some conflict with Dr. Harold Abbott (Tom Amandes), with whom his professional opinions differ. However, Harold's cranky demeanor and Andy's passive, cheerful attitude prove to mesh well, and the two begin a friendly rivalry. Ephram continually struggles with his emerging adolescence, his studies as a classical pianist, and his crush on Amy (Emily VanCamp), Harold's daughter.

The first season revolves around the main storyline involving Colin Hart (Mike Erwin), Amy's boyfriend and older brother Bright's (Chris Pratt) best friend. Amy sees the arrival of Andy as an opportunity: Colin has been in a coma since July 4 of the previous summer, after Bright and he were in a car accident. Amy befriends Ephram in an effort to convince Andy to revive his neurosurgeon skills to save Colin. Andy reluctantly agrees. Amy is elated, but Bright is sullen and distant about the situation. Later, he tearfully confesses to his father that—contrary to what he had claimed all summer—he does in fact remember the accident: He was the one driving Colin's father's truck and the two boys were drunk at the time. However, his anguish is relieved when Andy is successful, and soon Colin is awake.

In the meantime, Ephram's maternal grandparents come to visit their new home in the fall and Ephram decides he wants to move back to New York City to live with them. Ephram's grandfather—also a surgeon—berates Andy into letting Ephram go. Delia and her grandmother befriend Edna Harper (Debra Mooney), a semi-retired army nurse and Harold's estranged mother. They decide to throw her a surprise birthday party at the Browns' home. During the party, in front of all the guests, Ephram and Andy have a loud fight about his moving to New York City. The two stalk to different parts of the house with no decision resolved. Andy and his father-in-law also begin to fight about the situation but are interrupted because Bright has collapsed. He needs his appendix removed, but the snow has prevented travel to the nearest hospital, so they do emergency surgery on him in Andy's office. Andy sees how concerned and loving Harold is toward his son and resolves to try and patch things up with Ephram. He confesses that he will be "half a man" if Ephram leaves, and as a result Ephram decides to stay.

Andy meets his next-door neighbor Nina Feeney (Stephanie Niznik) after a loud fight with Ephram in the front yard. She is friendly but outspoken and honest. Nina eventually explains that she is serving as a surrogate mother for a woman who was unable to conceive. A scandal erupts when Nina has the baby and it is revealed that the mother is well over fifty, but Andy supports Nina's decision.

All is not well, however, for Colin. He returns home and re-enrolls in school, but he has lost most of his memory, including his memory of Amy. Under pressure to step back into his old life, Colin befriends Ephram since the latter is the only person who does not have a preconceived notion of him. Amy, meanwhile, struggles with emerging feelings for Ephram as he has an unsuccessful relationship with Colin's sister, Laynie. His lingering attachment to Amy flares up at inopportune moments, causing Laynie to break it off.

Soon Colin begins lashing out violently and acting out emotionally and loses his friendship with Ephram. Ephram tries to let his friends know that Colin is not acting normally, but Amy believes he is just jealous of her relationship with Colin and that Colin is "under a lot of stress." Bright, frustrated at Colin's friendship with Ephram in the first place, refuses to listen as well, until Colin accosts Ephram outside the local diner, proceeding to uncharacteristically punch Bright in the face when he objects to Colin's roughness. Andy believes Ephram (also following a grievous, self-inflicted hand injury during a homecoming ceremony) and brings the subject up with Colin's parents. They are unwilling to believe that Colin is anything but fully recovered and fire Andy from Colin's care. Physical symptoms begin to manifest as well, and eventually Colin collapses. It is learned there are complications from the first surgery. Colin's parents ask Andrew to operate again, but then he experiences complications during the surgery.

Cast
The initial season had eight major roles getting star billing in the opening credits. Treat Williams portrayed Dr. Andrew "Andy" Brown, the newly widowed father of Ephram Brown (portrayed by Gregory Smith) and Delia Brown (portrayed by Vivien Cardone) and runs his own clinic "free of charge" in an abandoned train station. Emily VanCamp portrayed Amy Abbott, who befriends Ephram and is the girlfriend of Colin Hart, who, throughout the first half of the season, is still in a coma. Debra Mooney portrayed Edna Harper, a semi-retired army nurse and Harold's estranged mother. John Beasley portrayed Irv Harper, the kind-hearted husband of Edna and the narrator of the series. Chris Pratt portrayed Bright Abbott, the older brother of Amy and best friend of Colin. Tom Amandes portrayed Dr. Harold Abbott, the father of Amy and Bright, who begins a friendly rivalry with Andy.

Main Cast
 Treat Williams as Dr. Andrew "Andy" Brown (23 episodes)
 Gregory Smith as Ephram Brown (23 episodes)
 Emily VanCamp as Amy Abbott (23 episodes)
 Debra Mooney as Edna Harper (19 episodes)
 John Beasley as Irv Harper (21 episodes)
 Vivien Cardone as Delia Brown (22 episodes)
 Chris Pratt as Bright Abbott (17 episodes)
 Tom Amandes as Dr. Harold Abbott (23 episodes)

Episodes

DVD release
The DVD of season one was released on September 7, 2004. It has been released in Regions 1, 2 and 4. As well as every episode from the season, the DVD release features bonus material such as unaired scenes, "Behind the Scenes Fun with Greg-and-Emily Cam", extended version of the Pilot, making-of featurette, "In Search of Everwood" and commentary on 4 key episodes by cast and crew.

References

2002 American television seasons
2003 American television seasons